Piccoma is a Japanese webtoon subscription service that is available on smartphones, tablets, and personal computers. It was developed and released by Kakao piccoma Corp., the Japanese subsidiary of Kakao.

Service
When the service was first launched, it offered a regular model of buying each individual manga and volume similar to other online shops but it has since moved to adopt the webtoon model where a user can purchase individual chapters and wait 24 hours to read some for free. Korean webtoons that are offered on Kakao's services (Daum Webtoon & KakaoPage) are offered through Piccoma in Japanese. Kakao Japan announced that it will start offering original Japanese, Korean, and Chinese webtoons for Piccoma in the summer of 2018. Kakao Japan changed its name to Kakao Piccoma Corporation in Nov. 2021

in  2018 they founded the manga award "Piccoma AWARD"

in November 2021, it announced its expansion in Europe and North America, and in September of the same year , it also revealed that it had established a local subsidiary in France . On March 17 2021, Kakao launched its French language service of Piccoma which includes translated webtoons as well as translated manga.

See also
 Kakao Webtoon
 KakaoPage
 LINE Manga

References

External links
 

Kakao
Manga hosting services